Joanna Pickering is a British-born actress and playwright. She is known for her Trilogy Truth, Lies and Deception, her acting work in Pelleas starring alongside Alice Eve, and is represented by 3 Arts Entertainment.

Early life  
Pickering was born in Northumberland, England. She was awarded an academic scholarship and studied at La Sagesse School. She was top in her exams and gained 10 A to A* at GCSE. She was accepted into Central High School and studied mathematics, physics, chemistry, and general studies A levels. She graduated from University of Stirling with a Bachelor of Science degree in pure mathematics. After turning down a job in banking, she worked in Southern France selling yachts and high performance cars to fund acting school. She trained in method acting in stage and film at the Lee Strasberg Theatre and Film Institute in New York City.

Career

Early acting
Pickering began her acting career working in low-budget, cult, avant-garde, and experimental film. She worked as a fashion model while taking bit roles in UK television, such as the Chris Morris show Nathan Barley, radio plays and theatre work. She performed a minor role in the British comedy Svengali. In 2013, Pickering was cast as the principal role in an adaptation of the novel Mersey Boys centered around The Beatles, and in its Off-Broadway play. However, the film ran out of post-production budget. In 2014, filming on location in Berlin, Pickering portrayed the dada artist, Elsa von Freytag-Loringhoven. The film contributed to The Filmballad of MamaDada screening at the Whitney Museum of American Art in New York City as a directorial collective film about von Freytag-Loringhoven. It had a world premier at Copenhagen International Film Festival. Pickering then had a supporting role in Leave Yourself Alone selected for the 2016 Anthology Film Archives Theater in New York City and released on VOD and Amazon Prime in 2017.

Acting 2017–present 

In 2018, Pickering was cast for stage in Eve Ensler's The Vagina Monologues performing in New York to raise money for V-day organization. In 2018, she performed on stage as Shakespeare's Lady Macbeth sponsored by Pittsburgh Shakespeare in Park in a televised series due for US Public-access television, as featured in British Shakespeare magazine.

In 2018, Pickering was cast in a principal role in Pelleas co-starring alongside Alice Eve and Benn Northover and directed by film maker Josephine Meckseper. The actors perform an adaptation of Maeterlinck's play from the Claude Debussy's opera. In May 2018, Pelleas screened at Whitney Museum of American Art in The Incomplete history of Protest exhibition. 

In 2019, she completed shooting in a principal role co-starring alongside Blanche Baker and William Sadler in a 1950s thriller Alice Fades Away with a United States theatrical release for 2020. Pickering also filmed a day player role, as Mary, in Danny Boyle's executive produced movie Creation Stories].

In 2021, Pickering performed two lead roles on stage in her own trilogy in Paris.  Reviews were positive and that she played her role with "depth and sophistication."

Pickering won best actress in an independent film at Los Angeles Film Awards for her work on Diva. The film also won best film and best director.

Writing 
Pickering first performed her own creative writing airing on live radio for The Fall of Babylon show on Resonance FM in London. She self-published her diaries from traveling nomadically between 2009 and 2012 under a pen name. Her pen name was exposed in press in 2012 and Pickering announced on her website she had removed her writing from the public domain.

Pickering was selected for The Women in Film challenge as screenwriter. Her short film Boardwalk was made with an all female cast and crew. It screened at Anthology Film Archives Theater, September 2018. It was described as "sensational, fluid and beautiful". It was nominated as best film and best mystery thriller at NY Web Fest in 2019.

In 2018, her short play Beach Break was selected by Primitive Grace Theater to run at the Bridge Theater as part of The Duende Reading Series as a one act play. It was a 2018 official selection by ScreenCraft Stage Plays. As a radio play podcast it was selected as a top ten finalist for HBO's ITV festival broadcasting live in October 2018 with Pickering performing. It aired in UK on Resonance FM in February 2019. The full play Beach Break was awarded a scholarship from Rocaberti Writers to mentor with HBO's Kelly Edwards, in an adaptation for screen in 2021.

Pickering published a Trilogy of plays, Truth, Lies and Deception with Next Stage Press. The plays released in August 2021. The plays as a trilogy first showcased at The League of Professional Theatre Women, and included Beach Break, Cat and Mouse, and Sylvie and Sly. The readings were performed with Broadway actors Dan Lauria and Caroline Aaron. The plays tackle themes of sexism, assault and ageism.

Truth, Lies and Deception ran at Le Pave d'Orsay Theatre in Paris in December 2021. Pickering played a lead role alongside Robert Bradford, Koel Purie and Eugenia Kuzmina, directed by Christopher Mack and Pulcherie Gadmer. Angela Mcluskey provided music. The plays were described in Broadway World as "brave, masterful, suspenseful with comical dark interchanges." Cat and Mouse was reviewed as controversial as it approaches subject matter from a yet untouched angle.

In 2022, Pickering's play The Endgame, as a 30-minute version, was developed and announced as part of the Woman's Work lab festival with The New Perspective Theatre Company to run on stage in New York City. The play takes place over a game of chess and addresses issues of reporting acquaintance rape.

In October, 2022, Pickering's full play Bad Victims opened at The Courtyard Theatre, in London, directed by Erica Gould. Bad Victims released in press (Broadway world UK and OffWestEnd) as a thriller centered around sex, power, and crime. "It picks up where psychological thrillers like Promising Young Woman and Anatomy of a Scandal left off" and the writing style described as "Sarah Kane meets Noel Coward with the deviousness of Phoebe Waller-Bridge to flip a scenario on its head."

Activism 
In 2018, she was a participant speaker and selected film maker at United Nations for Create2030, engaging artists in Sustainable Development Goals, attending at UNNIGO 2018, and UNGA2018. She moderates the Imagine This Female Film festival, Chelsea Film Festival, and is on Female in Film panel for New York Independent Film Festival.

Music 
Pickering performed as the lead actress for experimental feature film Kubricks directed by Dean Cavanagh and produced by Alan McGee. She is the actress for The Band of Holy Joy in a musical feature film City of Tales. She is filmed as herself in Valerio Rocco's art film Lover's Discourse screening in museums of contemporary art.

Pickering is the album cover model for The Band of Holy Joy album City of Tales released in 2015. For Spectorbullets she is the album cover model, the actress in 2010 music video Goldmine and she wrote the lyrics for the song Drop on their album released in 2012

Personal life
, Pickering resided in New York City.

References

External links 

 
 

21st-century British actresses
Alumni of the University of Stirling
Year of birth missing (living people)
Living people